The Battle of Jinan was between the forces of Chiang Kai-shek and those of his opponents. Fu Zuoyi abandoned Jinan and the National Revolutionary Army entered the city on August 16.

Conflicts in 1930